This is a list of films produced by the Tollywood film industry based in Hyderabad in 1969.

External links
 Earliest Telugu language films at IMDb.com (538 to 564)

1969
Telugu
Telugu films